Down to Earth is the sixth studio album by American singer-songwriter Stevie Wonder, released on November 16, 1966 on the Tamla (Motown) label. The album was a departure from Wonder's earlier, teen pop-driven albums, and, along with its predecessor, Up-Tight, it re-established the sixteen-year-old Wonder, whose voice had recently changed, as a Motown hitmaker.

The album features the hit single "A Place in the Sun". Another single, "Hey Love", became a hit for Detroit soul singer Bettye LaVette the following year.

Track listing

Side One
"A Place in the Sun" (Ron Miller, Bryan Wells) - 2:52
"Bang Bang" (Sonny Bono) - 2:42
"Down to Earth" (Miller, Avery Vanderberg) - 2:50
"Thank You Love" (Henry Cosby, Sylvia Moy, Stevie Wonder) - 2:55
"Be Cool, Be Calm (And Keep Yourself Together)" (Cosby, Moy, Wonder) - 2:43
"Sylvia" (Cosby, Moy, Wonder) - 2:34

Side Two
"My World Is Empty Without You" (Holland-Dozier-Holland) - 2:53
"The Lonesome Road" (Gene Austin, Nat Shilkret) - 3:06
"Angel Baby (Don't You Ever Leave Me)" (Cosby, Moy) - 2:45
"Mr. Tambourine Man" (Bob Dylan) - 2:30
"Sixteen Tons" (Merle Travis) - 2:42
"Hey Love" (Morris Broadnax, Clarence Paul, Wonder) - 2:41

Personnel

Stevie Wonder – harmonica, keyboards, drums, percussion, vocals 
The Originals - backing vocals
The Andantes - backing vocals
Benny Benjamin – drums
James Jamerson – bass guitar
The Funk Brothers – instrumentation
Clarence Paul and Henry Cosby – producers

References 

1966 albums
Stevie Wonder albums
Albums produced by Henry Cosby
Albums produced by Clarence Paul
Tamla Records albums
Albums recorded at Hitsville U.S.A.